Shamaldy-Say is a village in Jalal-Abad Region of Kyrgyzstan. It is part of Nooken District. It lies adjacent to the urban-type settlement Shamaldy-Say, which is part of the city Tash-Kömür, and close to the border with Uzbekistan. Its population was 6,526 in 2021.

Population

References

Populated places in Jalal-Abad Region